Astrid Maria Bernadette Joosten is a Dutch television personality and presenter. She is known for the magazine programme Jongbloed en Joosten, and presenting the quiz show Twee voor Twaalf. She also starred in the 2005 film Off Screen.

Personal life
Joosten was married to Dutch television producer Willem Ennis, until his death from cancer.

Television presentations
Joosten has presented a series of programmes on Dutch television since 1988, including Jongbloed en Joosten, In het Nieuws, Gala Toon 75, De Show van Je Leven, De Verleiding, Twee voor Twaalf and Kanniewaarzijn.

Awards
In April 2017, Joosten was honoured as a Knight of the Order of Orange-Nassau for her extensive work on Dutch television over the past 25 years and her commitment to various charities.

External links

References

1958 births
Living people
People from Beverwijk
Dutch television presenters
Dutch women television presenters
20th-century Dutch women writers
21st-century Dutch women writers
Knights of the Order of Orange-Nassau
Nationaal Songfestival presenters